Sara Bahrami (born September 19, 1982) is an Iranian actress. She has received various accolades, including a Crystal Cymorgh, an Iran Cinema Celebration Award and an Iran's Film Critics and Writers Association Award.

Career 
Born in the central Iranian city of Isfahan, Sara Bahrami has studied Theater at university.

She has acted in series such as ‘Euphrates’, ‘Like a Nightmare’, ‘Parvaneh’, and ‘The Recluse’.

Bahrami has also appeared in a number of movies, including ‘Gita’, ‘Teheran’, ‘A Simple Romance’, ‘Italy Italy’, ‘A House on 41st Street’ and ‘I am Diego Maradona’.

Filmography

Film

Web

Television

Awards and nominations

References

External links
 

1983 births
Living people
People from Isfahan
People from Tehran
Actresses from Tehran
Iranian film actresses
Iranian stage actresses
Iranian television actresses
21st-century Iranian actresses
Crystal Simorgh for Best Actress winners